Height above mean sea level is a measure of the vertical distance (height, elevation or altitude) of a location in reference to a historic mean sea level taken as a vertical datum. In geodesy, it is formalized as orthometric heights.

The combination of unit of measurement and the physical quantity (height) is called "metres above mean sea level" in the metric system, while in United States customary and imperial units it would be called "feet above mean sea level".

Mean sea levels are affected by climate change and other factors and change over time. For this and other reasons, recorded measurements of elevation above sea level at a reference time in history might differ from the actual elevation of a given location over sea level at a given moment.

Uses 
Metres above sea level is the standard measurement of the elevation or altitude of:
 Geographic locations such as towns, mountains and other landmarks.
 The top of buildings and other structures.
 Flying objects such as airplanes or helicopters.

How it is determined 
The elevation or altitude in metres above sea level of a location, object, or point can be determined in a number of ways. The most common include:
 Global Navigation Satellite System (like GPS), where a receiver determines a location from pseudoranges to multiple satellites. A geoid is needed to convert the 3D position to sea-level elevation.
 Altimeter, that measures atmospheric pressure, which decreases as altitude increases. As atmospheric pressure changes with the weather too, a recent local measure of the pressure at a known altitude is needed to calibrate the altimeter.
 Stereoscopy in aerial photography. 
 Aerial lidar and satellite laser altimetry.
 Aerial or satellite radar altimetry.
 Surveying, especially levelling.

Accurate measurement of historical mean sea levels is complex. Land mass subsidence (as occurs naturally in some regions) can give the appearance of rising sea levels. Conversely, markings on land masses that are uplifted due to geological processes can suggest a lowering of mean sea level.

Abbreviations 
Often, just the abbreviation MSL is used, e.g. Mount Everest (8848 m MSL), or the reference height is omitted completely, e.g. Mount Everest (8848 m).

Metres above mean sea level is commonly abbreviated mamsl or MAMSL, based on the abbreviation AMSL for "above mean sea level".
Other abbreviations are m.a.s.l. and MASL for "metres above sea level".

See also 
 Depth below seafloor
 Geoid
 Height above average terrain
 Height above ground level
 List of places on land with elevations below sea level
 Vertical metre

References 

Geography terminology
Geodesy
Topography
Altitudes in aviation
Vertical position
Zero-level elevation points